Karin Knapp and Mandy Minella were the defending champions but Knapp chose not to participate. Minella played with Elina Svitolina, but they lost in the first round to Estrella Cabeza Candela and Laura Pous Tió.

Catalina Castaño and Mariana Duque Mariño won the title, defeating Florencia Molinero and Teliana Pereira in the final, 3–6, 6–1, [10–5].

Seeds

Draw

References 
 Draw

Copa Bionaire - Doubles
Copa Bionaire